Easington railway station served the town of Easington Colliery and Easington Village in County Durham, North East England.

History
The original station was opened by the North Eastern Railway as a stop on its new coastal line which linked the former Londonderry, Seaham and Sunderland Railway at Seaham and the former Hartlepool Dock and Railway at  when that line was opened to passenger traffic on 1 April 1905. This line was primarily built to avoid the steep gradients of the inland route at Seaton Bank and  Bank but also provided access to the newly developed collieries along the Durham Coast. During World War II, an additional halt -  - was provided on the line between here and Seaham for workmen.

Along with other stations minor stations on the Durham Coast Line, Easington was recommended for closure as part of the Beeching cuts. Passenger services continue to pass through the site of the station, but the only station between Seaham and Hartlepool to have been reopened (as of 2021) is at Horden.

References

Disused railway stations in County Durham
Former North Eastern Railway (UK) stations
Railway stations in Great Britain opened in 1905
Railway stations in Great Britain closed in 1964
Beeching closures in England